"Well Oh Well" is a song written by Lois Mann, Tiny Bradshaw, and Henry Bernard. It was performed by Bradshaw and released on the King label (catalog no. 4357-AA). It debuted on Billboard magazine's R&B chart on May 20, 1950, peaked at No. 2 (best seller and juke box), and remained on the chart for 21 weeks. It was ranked No. 7 on Billboards year-end list of the best-selling R&B records of 1950 (No. 11 based on juke box plays).

See also
 Billboard Top R&B Records of 1950

References

1949 songs
Rhythm and blues songs